The Battle of Lahore was fought between the Afghan forces of Ahmad Shah Durrani against the Mughal forces under Shah Nawaz on 11 January 1748. The battle resulted in a victory for the Afghans, and the city of Lahore was briefly occupied by the Afghans.

Background 
Following the death of Zakariya Khan the governor of Lahore in July 1745, the Mughal Wazier Qamaruddin Khan would appoint the two sons of Zakariya Khan as the governors of Lahore and Multan. Yahya Khan the son of Zakariya Khan was appointed governor of Lahore, and Shah Nawaz was appointed governor of Multan. Yahya Khan's administration over Lahore would soon be challenged by his brother Shah Nawaz, who soon arrived in Lahore on November 1746. Shah Nawaz demanded a complete division of their dead father's property. This dispute over Zakariya Khan's estate resulted in a war between the two brothers and their armies which lasted from November 1746 to March 1747.

On 17 March 1747, Shah Nawaz was able to defeat Yahya Khan and held him in captivity. Shah Nawaz usurped the governorship over Lahore and appointed Kaura Mal as his diwan and recognized Adina Beg Khan as faujdar of the Jalandhar Doaba. Shah Nawaz began negotiating with the Delhi government to recognize his governorship over the province, and used his captive brother as a bargaining tool. However, instead the Mughal emperor Muhammad Shah threatened direct military action against Shah Nawaz. Yahya Khan was also able to escape from Shah Nawaz's captivity and fled towards Delhi. Shah Nawaz soon began looking for foreign help. Shah Nawaz had heard of the military exploits of Ahmad Shah Durrani who had just taken Kabul and Peshawar from the Mughal governor Nasir Khan. Shah Nawaz decided to invite Ahmed Shah for Military help after being convinced by Adina Beg. Ahmad Shah agreed to the request on the condition that Shah Nawaz accept Afghan suzerainty, and he soon began his invasion from Peshawar on December 1747.

Battle 
Adina Beg soon informed the Delhi government of Shah Nawaz's invitation of Durrani. Qamaruddin Khan was disappointed at hearing the news and soon wrote a letter to Shah Nawaz. In this letter Qamaruddin Khan agreed to recognize Shah Nawaz's control over Lahore on the condition that he oppose Ahmad Shah's forces. Shah Nawaz agreed to the wazir's request and he now turned hostile towards the Afghans. Jahan Khan had crossed the Indus river with 8,000 of his men. Shah Nawaz fought the Afghan force and forced Jahan Khan to retreat towards Peshawar, where Jahan Khan waited for Ahmad Shah's forces to arrive. Ahmad Shah entered the Punjab and occupied the fort of Rohtas. When he heard news of Shah Nawaz changing his allegiance to the Mughals, he sent Sabir Shah and Muhammad Yar Khan to Lahore. However, Shah Nawaz felt insulted by the remarks made by Sabir Shah and ordered him to be executed, while Muhammad Yar Khan was let go. Hearing news of Sabir Shah's execution, Ahmad Shah began his march towards the city of Lahore. He also confirmed the holdings of Rawalpindi to Muqarrab Khan a Gakkhar chief during Ahmad Shah's journey towards Gujrat

Ahmad Shah Durrani had around 18,000 Afghan soldiers under his command, one third of which where from his own tribe. Durrani's army however lacked any artillery and was much smaller compared to the Mughals.According to J.L Mehta, Ahmad Shah Durrani had around 40,000 soldiers under his command during his invasion.Shah Nawaz had around 70,000 Soldiers under his command along with artillery. On January 10, 1748, Durrani and his army camped near the Shalamar gardens. The Afghan and Mughal Forces would fight one another on January 11, 1748.

Khwajah Asmatullah Khan, one of the Mughal commanders, had around 10,000 cavalry and 5,000 Musketeers, while Lachin beg another commander had around 5,000 soldiers. According to Historian Sir Jadhunath Sarkar, Asmatullah and Lachin Beg had around 16,000 soldiers under their command. Shah Nawaz sent Jalhe Khan, a Pashtun commander from Kasur, to oppose Durrani's forces. However instead Jalhe Khan defected to the Afghan side and Joined Ahmad Shah Durrani. Ahmad Shah sent 1,000 of his musketeers to fire upon the Mughal forces and to retreat beyond the enemies range. Shah Nawaz soon consulted a astrologer to know the result of the battle. The astrologer told Shah Nawaz that there should not be any fighting that day and to instead attack the Afghans the next day. Shah Nawaz agreed to the advice and told his officers Adina Beg and Diwan Kaura mal not to move out and oppose the Afghan forces and to only fight the Afghans within the Mughal entrenchments.

Ahmad Shah was able to overpower the Qizilbash soldiers of the Mughal army and began pursuing them into their entrenchments. Asmatullah Khan began calling in for reinforcements. Adina Beg failed in properly reinforcing Asmatullah and Adina Beg soon fled towards Lahore. Some of the Mughal soldiers took this as a sign of a ceasefire, and retreated to their trenches in complete disorder. The Afghans now launched a full-scale attack on the Mughal forces which forced Asmatullah Khan to retreat. The various guns and artillery that was stored in the fort of Hazrat Ishan fell in the hands of the Afghan forces. Adina Beg fired cannons and rockets onto the Afghan forces. However, the Afghans were able to overpower the resistance offered by the Mughals. Shah Nawaz escaped Lahore and fled towards Delhi. Asmatullah Khan was killed during the battle.

Aftermath 

Ahmad Shah Durrani and the Afghan forces entered Lahore on January 12, 1748. The previous members of the Lahore government that had been imprisoned by Shah Nawaz were released by the Afghans. Mir Momin Khan, Lakhpath Rai and Surat Singh all pleaded to Durrani to spare the city from plunder and paid a ransom to the Afghans. Ahmad Shah accepted the ransom and ordered his officers to make sure the Afghan soldiers wouldn't subject the city to plunder. Despite this, some parts of the city were looted by the Afghan forces. Various Guns, artillery, treasure and other goods all fell in the hands of the Afghan forces following their conquest of Lahore. Coins were also minted in the name of Ahmad Shah Durrani. Thousands of Women and Children were enslaved by the Afghans after their conquest of Lahore. The Afghans also conscripted thousands of Punjabis into the Afghan army. Ahmad Shah appointed Jalhe Khan of Kasur as the new governor of Lahore, with Mir Momin Khan as his deputy and Lakhpath Rai as his Diwan. Ahmad Shah stayed in the city of Lahore for five weeks and began his plans to advance towards Delhi. However, on his journey towards Delhi, Ahmad Shah and the Afghan forces fought a Mughal army at Manupur in which where Ahmad Shah suffered defeat. After the Mughal victory at Manupur,Moin ul Mulk was appointed as governor of Lahore. Both Jalhe Khan and Lakhpath Rai were arrested following the appointment of Moin ul Mulk as governor of Lahore.

See also 

 Waris Shah

References

Sources 

 Gandhi, Rajmohan (2013). Punjab: A History from Aurangzeb to Mountbatten. Alpeh Book company. ISBN 978-93-83064-4 1-0
 Gupta, Hari (1944). Studies in Later Mughal History of The Punjab 1707 To 1793. The Minerva Book company.
 Lee, Johnathan (2018). Afghanistan A History From 1260 To The Present. Reaktion Books. ISBN 978-178914-0101
 Mehta, J (2005). Advanced Study in the History of Modern India 1707-1813. New Dawn Press Inc. ISBN 1 932705 54 6.
 Singh, Ganda (1959). Ahmad Shah Durrani, father of modern Afghanistan. Asia Publishing House.
 Singh, Ganda (1990). Sardar Jassa Singh Ahluwalia. Publication Bureau Punjabi University Patiala.
 Singh, Surinder (1985). The Mughal Subah Of Lahore 1581 To 1751 A Study In Administrative Structure And Practices. Panjabi University, Chandigarh
 Sarkar, Jadhunath (1964) Fall of the Mughal Empire Vol. 1 (3rd ed.). Orient longman Ltd. London.

18th century in the Durrani Empire
Battles involving the Durrani Empire
Conflicts in 1748